Space Studios Manchester (formerly known as The Space Project) is an English purpose built film and television studio situated in Gorton, Manchester, with 6 acoustically treated stages.

Construction began in 2013 and it opened in October 2014 as a spin off to The Sharp Project. It is currently 360,000 square feet in size, which includes 85,000 square feet of studio space, with plans to expand the site further.  Productions filmed at the facility include The A Word, Houdini and Doyle and stunt scenes used in Coronation Street. It is also now the home for the BBC's Dragons' Den.

References

Buildings and structures in Manchester
Television studios in Greater Manchester
2014 establishments in England